N.Y. Export: Opus Jazz is a ballet made by Jerome Robbins, subsequently ballet master of New York City Ballet (NYCB) to music of the same title by Robert Prince. The premiere took place on 8 June 1958 at the Festival of the Two Worlds in Spoleto, performed by Ballets: USA and subsequently on Broadway. The NYCB premiere was on  29 April 2005 at the New York State Theater, Lincoln Center, with scenery by Ben Shahn, costumes by Florence Klutz and lighting by Jennifer Tipton.

Casts

Original Spoleto 

 Patricia Dunn
 Wilma Curley
 Sondra Lee
 Gwen Lewis
 Erin Martin
 Barbra Milberg
 Beryl Towbin
 Joan Van Orden
 Jay Norman
 Tom Abbott
 Bob Bakanic
 John Mandia
 James White
 John Jones
 James Moore
 staged by Edward Verso

NYCB premiere 

 Ellen Bar
 Rebecca Krohn
 Ashley Laracey
 Georgina Pazcoguin
 Tiler Peck
 Sara Ricard
 Rachel Rutherford
 Stephanie Zungre

 Antonio Carmena
 Adrian Danchig-Waring
 Craig Hall
 Adam Hendrickson
 Seth Orza
 Amar Ramasar
 Sean Suozzi
 Andrew Veyette

References 

 
 Playbill, NYCB, Thursday, June 5, 2008

 Repertory Week, NYCB, Winter Season, 2008 repertory, week 6

Articles 
 DANCE VIEW; City Ballet, at the Boiling Point, NY Times by Anna Kisselgoff, July 2, 1995

Reviews

 
 NY Times, Anna Kisselgoff, April 28, 2005

 NY Times, July 14, 1961
 NY Times, John Martin, October 29, 1961

Ballets by Jerome Robbins
New York City Ballet repertory
1958 ballet premieres
Ballets by Robert Prince
Ballets designed by Ben Shahn